Palacio de Junco aka the Museo Histórico Provincial de Matanzas was built for the del Junco  family in Matanzas between 1835 and 1838.  It has housed the Museo Histórico Provincial de Matanzas since 1980. It is located at the Plaza de La Viga on Milanes Street, between Magdalena and Ayllón streets in Matanzas, Cuba.  It is an outstanding example of Matanzas' 19th-century houses. Its arcades on both the ground and first floors are reminiscent of the 18th-century houses around the Plaza Vieja in Havana.  At roof level is a parapet complete with ornamental urns, a typical feature of 19th century Cuban colonial architecture.

References
 The Houses of Old Cuba (Thames & Hudson, 1999) 

Museums in Cuba
Buildings and structures in Matanzas
Tourist attractions in Matanzas Province
Museums established in 1980
1980 establishments in Cuba
20th-century architecture in Cuba